The 1943 Allan Cup was the Canadian senior ice hockey championship for the 1942–43 season.

Final 
Best of 5
Ottawa 4 Victoria 3
Ottawa 6 Victoria 4
Victoria 4 Ottawa 3
Ottawa 2 Victoria 0

Ottawa Commandos beat Victoria Army 3-1 on series.

External links
Allan Cup archives 
Allan Cup website

 
Allan Cup
Allan